McLaurin House, also known as the Lamar McLaurin House, is a historic home located near Clio, Marlboro County, South Carolina.  It was built about 1880, and is a  two-story clapboard Italianate style frame dwelling. It has a truncated hip roof with a balustraded deck. The front façade features a one-story porch with balustrade and decorative brackets.  Also on the property are three contributing outbuildings.

It was listed on the National Register of Historic Places in 1978.

References

Houses on the National Register of Historic Places in South Carolina
Italianate architecture in South Carolina
Houses completed in 1880
National Register of Historic Places in Marlboro County, South Carolina
Houses in Marlboro County, South Carolina